Cycling was contested at the 1958 Asian Games in Tokyo, Japan from May 25 to June 1.

Medalists

Road

Track

Medal table

Participating nations
A total of 36 athletes from 7 nations competed in cycling at the 1958 Asian Games:

References
Medalists Road
Medalists Track

 
1958 Asian Games events
1958
Asian Games
1958 in road cycling
1958 in track cycling
International cycle races hosted by Japan